That Man's Here Again is a 1937 American comedy film directed by Louis King, written by Lillie Hayward, and starring Hugh Herbert, Mary Maguire, Tom Brown, Joe King and Teddy Hart. It was released by Warner Bros. on April 17, 1937.

Plot
Jimmy (Tom Brown) is an elevator operator in a fancy apartment building.  
One night, Nancy (Mary Maguire), wet from the rain and having nowhere else to go, breaks into the basement of the building. 
Jimmy befriends her, and gets her a job working as a maid in the building.
Jimmy and Mary begin seeing each other.  Mary has a child, but she is hesitant
to tell Jimmy, who as expressed a negative attitude toward children. 
Mary breaks a vase in Mr. Jesse's apartment, and, believing it to be very valuable, 
and that she will likely be arrested, scrams, leaving a note for Jimmy but not indicating
where she will go.  Jimmy looks for her unsuccessfully. 
A letter arrives addressed to Mary which leads Jimmy to the
home where Mary's child is being taken care of, but the workers there
say they have not seen Mary in weeks.
Jimmy is very taken with the baby, and feels great sympathy for Mary's plight.
Finally, using the police's missing persons division, Jimmy learns that
Mary is in the hospital with pneumonia.  
Jimmy visits here there as she recovers.  
They return to the apartment building, where, with Mr. Jesse's help, things
work out well for them.

Cast         
Hugh Herbert as Thomas J. Jesse
Mary Maguire as Nancy Lee
Tom Brown as Jimmy Whalen
Joe King as Mr. Ned Murdock 
Teddy Hart as Bud

References

External links 
 

1937 films
Warner Bros. films
American comedy films
1937 comedy films
Films directed by Louis King
American black-and-white films
Films produced by Hal B. Wallis
1930s English-language films
1930s American films